Chromosome 16 open reading frame 7 is a protein that in humans is encoded by the C16orf7 gene.

References

External links

Further reading